Benquet is a commune in the Landes department in Nouvelle-Aquitaine in southwestern France.

Geography

Neighboring cities are: Saint-Pierre-du-Mont, Bretagne-de-Marsan, Saint-Maurice-sur-Adour, Saint-Sever, Bas-Mauco, Haut-Mauco.

History
Benquet, belonging to the former royal province of Gascony, was under the rule of the abbey of Saint Sever. Jehan Bernard de Benquet, vassal of the prince of Navarre, had the title of Sénéchal of Marsan and of Gabardan. Fights with French Huguenots are reported here.

Population

Its inhabitants are called Benquetois.

Economy
Mostly corn-growing, breeding (ducks, geese), foie-gras making. Agri-foodstuff research center.

Twin cities
Benquet is the twin village of Muespach-le-Haut, on the German border. As a matter of fact, population from Alsace flew their region and found shelter in South-Western France when the Nazi troops arrived in the early stages of World War II.

Sights
Churches St John the Baptist (19th century) and Saint Christau (eleventh century). Benquet is a stopover on the medieval pilgrimage route to Santiago Compostela (route of Vézelay). Benquet boasts a  the privately owned château de Laurens Castelet and a "miraculous" spring, close to the church of St Christau.

King Henri IV had an elegant home in Benquet: the Château-Vieux lodge (no longer exists).

Religion and language
People are mostly Catholic. The official language is French. The Gascon language is still spoken by some elderly people on some occasions.

Recreational activities
Hunting (woodcocks, pheasants...) and fishing are very popular + walking (pilgrims to Santiago are still to be met), cycling, basketball playing.

Events
 Music Festival Atout Choeurs : early May
 Fair of Benquet : early July

See also
 Communes of the Landes département

References

External links
 Site the village of Benquet (in French)
 Site of the Roitelets basketballclub (in French)

Communes of Landes (department)